Rishi is a surname. 

Notable people with the surname include:

Adil Rishi (1989), Indian first-class cricketer
Manu Rishi (1971), Indian actor, lyricist, script and dialogue writer who works in Hindi films
Mukesh Rishi (1956), Indian actor and film producer
Nirmal Rishi (born 1943), Indian Punjabi film and television actress
Nund Rishi (c. 1377 – c. 1438), Kashmiri Sufi saint, mystic, poet and Islamic preacher
Rajesh Rishi (1964), Indian politician
Ravi Rishi (1955–2016), non-resident Indian businessman
Richard Rishi (born 1977), Indian actor who has appeared in South Indian films
Vineeta Rishi (1981), English actress
Weer Rajendra Rishi (1917–2002), Indian linguist, diplomatic translator, and Romani studies scholar

See also

 Rishi (given name)
 
 Rishi (disambiguation)

Hindustani-language surnames
Surnames of Hindustani origin